Harris Tweed is a textile, made on Harris, Western Isles, Scotland.

Harris Tweed may also refer to:
Harris Tweed (character), a character in The Eagle comic
Harris Tweed, a character in The Well of Lost Plots by Jasper Fforde
The former name of the South African music group Dear Reader

See also
Tweed (disambiguation)
Twill